was a Japanese scholar of yangmingism who, through his philosophy, reportedly exerted considerable influence on many Japanese politicians, including postwar prime ministers of Japan. He has been considered a backroom power broker or eminence grise.

Early life
He was born in Osaka city on February 13, 1898. When he was a child his parents taught him to read the Chinese classics, the Four Books (The Great Learning, Doctrine of the Mean, The Analects of Confucius, and Mencius).

He studied at Tokyo Imperial University and his graduation paper A study of Wang Yangming  caught the attention of many intellectuals and politicians in the area. After graduating in 1922, he worked for six months at the Ministry of Education.

He established an institute of Asian studies and insisted on the traditional nationalism of Japan when Taishō democracy was in vogue (1912–1926). While working as an instructor at the Department of Asian Thought, Takushoku University, he wrote books such as Studies on the Japanese Spirit and Studies on Emperors and Government Officials, attracting the attention of some noblemen and military officers. In 1927, he established a private school, Kinkei Gakuen, in the house of Sakai Tadamasa who was a member of the House of Peers (Japan). In 1931, with the help of zaibatsu, Japanese conglomerates, he established a private school in Saitama Prefecture, Nihon Nōshi Gakkō, (or, Japan Farmers' School) to teach Asian thought and his philosophy.  In 1932, he founded a right-wing group called Kokuikai. Fumimaro Konoe, Kōki Hirota and other influential figures joined, but the group came to be perceived as an eminence grise, leading to its end after two years.

He was a brilliant student; however, he skipped classes when he was at Tokyo Imperial University in favor of reading books at the library. In the second edition of his study on Wang Yangming in 1960, he wrote of reading many important Western works, but also of returning to Chinese and Japanese works.  He said, "I felt that my backbone was strengthened when I read through Records of the Grand Historian and Zizhi Tongjian."

Influence
Yasuoka's philosophy influenced many people. Mitsugi Nishida and Ikki Kita who were associated with the February 26 Incident were reputedly influenced by him, although exactly how is not known. Among others influenced by him, some through his books and others personally, were Isoroku Yamamoto, Masaharu Homma, Yukio Mishima, Yashiro Rokuro, Chiang Kai-shek, sumo grand champion Futabayama, and Eiji Yoshikawa. In 1944, he became an adviser to the Ministry of Greater East Asia.

After the war
The GHQ ordered the dissolution of his previous groups and schools, and Yasuoka himself was purged on the ground of his involvement in the Ministry of Greater East Asia. In 1949 he organized the Shiyukai (Friends of Teacher); this group has continued to this day (2012) and includes a Hokkaido Shiyukai, Kansai Shiyukyokai and Himeji Shiyukai. After the war, he was asked to write the policy speeches of many prime ministers.  He also became a spiritual guide and teacher to many prime ministers, including Shigeru Yoshida (who called Yasuoka old teacher in spite of Yoshida's being 20 years senior), Hayato Ikeda, Eisaku Satō, Takeo Fukuda and Masayoshi Ohira.  He was reluctant, however, to speak of this.

Yasuoka is known to have edited the Imperial Surrender Rescript in some points. On August 12, 1945, Hisatsune Sakomizu, the chief Secretary of the Cabinet, visited Yasuoka at his house and asked him to audit the Surrender Rescript. Yasuoka made many changes, but on the next day found one of the three points he insisted on remained unchanged.  Yasuoka met Hirohito three times after the war, at garden parties. Hirohito thanked Yasuoka for the trouble at the end of the war, and asked Yasuoka if he was studying as before, to which Yasuoka replied "Yes" with delight.  After Yasuoka's death Hirohito once attended a round-table discussion at which one of the attendants noted, "Yasuoka had once said that once the emperor said something, nothing could be told in addition." To this, Hirohito nodded.

Due to his knowledge of the history of China, Yasuoka was asked to name various societies: Kōchikai ("Broad Pond Society") is one of them. Also thanks to his Chinese scholarship, he gave the new era its name, Heisei, although he did not outlive the Shōwa era. Heisei was conceived by Yasuoka in 1979, which was communicated to the government. Tatsuro Yamamoto, professor emeritus of Tokyo University, again told the government, as reported in 1995.

Books

In English
 The Japanese Ethos: A Study of National Character

In Japanese
Lectures on the Thoughts in China and Persons, Gen-osha, 1921
A study of Wang Yangming , Gen-osha, 1922. This book surprised many people.
A study of Japanese spirit Gen-osha, 1924
Shigaku-Ronko Japan Navy Academy, 1924
Generals of Asian Ethics Gen-osha, 1929
Phylosophy of Asian Politics Gen-osha, 1932
Doshin Zanhitsu Zenkoku Shiyukyokai, 1936
Japanese Spirits Nihon Seinenkan, 1936
Chinese Poems Nihon Hyoronsha, 1936
A Revised Version of Japanese Spirit Gen-osha, 1937
Keisei Sagen Tooe Shoin, 1940
World Travel Daiichi Shobo, 1942
Keisei Sagen Zen Obunsha, 1944
The Philosophy of Lao-tze and Zhuangzi (book) Fukumura Shuppan, 1946
Politicians and Pragmatism Fukumura Shuppan, 1948
To Japanese Parents Fukumura Shuppan, 1952
Shinpen Hyakuchoushuu Fukumura Shuppan, 1952
At critical time, New version of Keisei Sagen Fukumura Shuppan, 1953
Japan's destiny Meitoku Shuppansha 1955
The academic source of Kawai Soryukutsu, Gosonsha,1936,
Hyakuchoushuu, Fukumura Shuppan, 1946
Fukurongo, Myotoku Shuppansha, 1956
Laozi and BodhidharmaMyotoku Shuppansha, 1956
Heroes and Learning Myotoku Shuppansha, 1956
Morning Analects Myotoku Shuppansha, 1962
Youngsters are like that Zenkoku Shiyu Kyokai, 1964
Katsugaku Kansai Shiyukyokai, 1965
Lushi Chunqiu Kansai Shiyukyokai, 1967
Ups and Downs of Japan Zenkoku Shiyukyokai, 1968
Great Dialogue- Persons, Enterprizes and Management Kinki Nippon Tetsudo, 1969
Youngsters becoming Complete Zenkoku Shiyukyokai, 1971
Asking the Way Aichiken Shiyukyokai, 1971
Katsugaku No.2 Kansai Shiyukyokai, 1972
The Present Time and Science Kinki Nihon Tetsudo, 1976
Selected Poems Myotoku Shuppansha, 1955
Present-day Purposes Myotoku Shuppansha, 1956
Secret Stories of Ups and Downs Myotoku Shuppansha, 1958
Asian Thoughts and Phylosophers Myotoku Shuppansha, 1959
An Introduction to I Ching Myotoku Shuppansha, 1960
Yamato - Nature and Persons Nihon Tsuun, 1961
Yuurakushi Myotoku Shuppansha, 1961
Asian Science Reimei Shobo, 1961
Seisuiki Myootku Shuppansha, 1963
Toyoteki Gakufu Zenkoku Shiyukyokai, 1970
Yuraku Hicho  Zenkoku Shiyukyokai, 1973
Denshuroku Myotoku Shuppansha, 1973
10 Lectures of Asian Thoughts Zenkoku Shiyukyokai, 1977
Destiny and Spiritual Peace and Enlightenment - A Study of Intouroku Kansai Shiyukyokai, 1978
I Ching and life phylosophy Kansai Shiyukyokai, 1979
Records of Three Kingdoms and Human Science Zenkoku Shiyukyokai, 1979
Katsugaku part 3 Kansai Shiyukyokai, 1982

Published posthumously
Opened eyes - Katsugaku PHP Institute, 1985
Creating a destiny President sha, 1985
Nurturing a personality Chichi Publishing Company, 1986
Opening a destiny President sha, 1986
Shoshin Goroku Kansai Shiyukyokai, 1987
Recommendation of Human Science Fukumura Shuppan, 1987
Practice of Analects President sha, 1987
Lectures of phylosophys Chichi Publishing Company, 1988
Polishing human Nisshin Hodo, 1988
Tenchi Ujo Reimei Shobo, 1988
Creating human President sha, 1988
A Study of Premiers in Asia Fukumura Shuppan, 1988
The Heart of Lao-tze and Zhuangzi (book) Fukumura Shuppan, 1988
A New Version of Chinese CharactersFukumura Shuppan, 1989
Reading Shigingo Chichi Publishing Company, 1989 
Reading Classics Myotoku Shuppansha, 1989
Active Use of Sexagenary cycle President sha, 1989
Knowing a life span and spiritual peace and enlightenment President sha, 1991
Lectures at Gouken Gougaku Kenshusho, 1991
Human Science of Asia Chichi Publishing Company, 1993
How to live a human life Reimei Shobou, 1993

Footnotes

References
Masahiro Yasuoka chronological table editing committee. Chronological table of Masahiro Yasuoka, Masahiro Yasuoka Memorial Hall, Saitama,  1997.
Koshi Suda Masahiro Yasuoka - Instructor in politics and business world Shin-Jinbutsu Oraisha,1993 
Ushio Shiota, Kyoso of Shōwa, Yasuoka Masahiro Bungei Shunju, 1991
Hisahiko Okazaki, Kyoyono Susume Seishun Shuppansha, 2005 
Setsuko Ito, My Father Yasuoka Masahiro Kansai Shiyu Kyokai, 1998 

1898 births
1983 deaths
Japanese scholars
Japanese educators